Tim Sebastian (born 13 March 1952) is a television journalist and novelist. He is the moderator of Conflict Zone and The New Arab Debates, broadcast on Deutsche Welle. He previously worked for the BBC, where he hosted  The Doha Debates and was the first presenter of HARDtalk. He also presented Bloomberg TV's The Outsider, an India-focused debating programme.

He won the BAFTA (British Academy of Film and Television Arts) Richard Dimbleby award in 1981 and Britain's prestigious Royal Television Society Interviewer of the Year award in 2000 and 2001.

Education
Sebastian was born in London, England. He was educated at Westminster School, a fee-paying independent school in Central London. He holds a BA degree in Modern Languages from New College, Oxford and speaks both German and Russian.
He has a Diploma in Journalism Studies from Cardiff University, graduating in 1974.

Journalist
Sebastian began his journalism career at Reuters in 1974, moving to the BBC as foreign correspondent in Warsaw in 1979. He became BBC's Europe correspondent in 1982. At that time in 1983 in Wrocław, during Martial law in Poland, Tim Sebastian interviewed Kornel Morawiecki, the leader of the Polish anti-Soviet and anti-communist underground organization Fighting Solidarity, hiding from the Polish security service.

Between 1984 and 1985 (until his expulsion from the USSR in 1985) he was BBC's correspondent for Moscow in 1984 and then for Washington from 1986 to 1989.

Sebastian has worked for The Mail on Sunday, and has contributed to The Sunday Times.

Interviewer
Memorable Hard Talk interviews with world leaders included US Presidents Bill Clinton Donald Trump and Jimmy Carter, Archbishop Desmond Tutu, Singapore's first Prime Minister Lee Kuan Yew, and the last leader of the Soviet Union Mikhail Gorbachev. He currently hosts Conflict Zone, a one-on-one interview show on Deutsche Welle's international English-language channel.

In March 2016, he interviewed the leader of the German party AfD, Frauke Petry.

Debate moderator
Sebastian is a frequent moderator of major conferences, seminars and forums across the globe.

He was the chairman of The Doha Debates, a Qatar Foundation programme that was broadcast monthly on BBC World News where it was the highest-rated weekend programme. The Debates were founded by Sebastian in 2004 and their fifth series began in September 2008.

Following the political and social unrest in Egypt and Tunisia in early 2011, Tim Sebastian founded The New Arab Debates, which have been held in Egypt, Tunisia and Jordan and were broadcast on Deutsche Welle English as well as regional television channels. The debates are also held in Arabic and hosted by Egyptian TV presenter Mai El Sherbiny.

Awards
In 1982, Sebastian was awarded the British Academy of Film and Television Arts Richard Dimbleby Award and was named Television Journalist of the Year by the Royal Television Society. Additionally he has twice won the Royal Television Society's Interviewer of the Year Award for his HARDtalk interviews.

Personal life
His daughter is CNN journalist Clare Sebastian.

Bibliography

Non-fiction
 Nice Promises: Tim Sebastian in Poland (1985)
 I Spy in Russia (1986)

Novels
 The Spy in Question (1988)
 Spy Shadow (1989)
 Saviour's Gate (1991)
 Exit Berlin (1992)
 The Memory Church (1993)
 Last Rights (1993)
 Special Relations (1994)
 War Dance (1995)
 Ultra (1997)

References

External links
 "The Doha Debates" website
 Official biography of Tim Sebastian
 
 Interview in the Gulf Times: 'Sebastian is looking beyond the stereotypes'
 Interview in Oryx Magazine: 'Courting Controversy'
 Tim Sebastian and the Doha Debates
 "The New Arab Debates" website

1952 births
Living people
People educated at Westminster School, London
British reporters and correspondents
BBC newsreaders and journalists
BBC World News
BBC World Service presenters
English male journalists
English television presenters
BAFTA winners (people)
20th-century English novelists
English male novelists
Qatar Foundation people
20th-century English male writers